Leroy Gilbert (born September 28, 1947) is a former officer in the United States Navy and Chaplain of the United States Coast Guard.

Biography
A native of Albany, Georgia, Gilbert is an ordained Baptist pastor. Gilbert holds a B.A. from American Baptist College, an M.Div. from Howard University, an S.T.M. from Yale Divinity School, and M.A. from United States International University, an Ed.D. from Nova Southeastern University and a Ph.D. from Regent University. He is married with one daughter.

Career
Gilbert was commissioned an officer in the Navy in 1969. He served as Chaplain of the United States Coast Guard from 1998 to 2002 before retiring in 2006. Currently, he is serving as a pastor in Washington, D.C.

References

1947 births
Living people
People from Albany, Georgia
United States Navy officers
Howard University alumni
Baptist ministers from the United States
United States Navy chaplains
Yale Divinity School alumni
United States International University alumni
Nova Southeastern University alumni
Regent University alumni
Chaplains of the United States Coast Guard